Shilchon Public Stadium plans to be built as a multi-purpose stadium in Gwangju, Gyeonggi-do, South Korea.  It will be under construction from 2008 year and will be used mostly for amateur football matches and other activities.  It will open a few years later.

Other stadia in Gwangju, Gyeonggi-do, South Korea
Gwangju City Public Stadium, Opo Public Stadium and Toichon Public Stadium are also located in Gwangju, Gyeonggi-do, South Korea.

Football venues in South Korea
Sports venues in Gyeonggi Province
Multi-purpose stadiums in South Korea
Buildings and structures in Gwangju, Gyeonggi